Wilshere is an English surname. Notable people with the surname include:

 Jack Wilshere, English former footballer
 John Wilshere, Papua New Guinean professional rugby league footballer
 R S Wilshere, Northern Irish architect
 Whitey Wilshere, Major League Baseball pitcher born 1912
 William Wilshere, British politician born 1806

English-language surnames